Piotr Długosielski (born 4 April 1977 in Warsaw) is a retired Polish athlete specializing in the 400 metres. He was part of the Polish 4 x 400 metres relay during its best years, winning several medals, although he was often selected to run in heats only. He participated at the 2000 Summer Olympics in Sydney.

He is currently the secretary of the Polish Athletics Federation.

Competition record

Personal best
Outdoor
 200 metres – 21.19 (1998)
 400 metres – 45.67 (Bydgoszcz 2001)
Indoor
 400 metres – 47.42 (Spała 1999)

References

1977 births
Living people
Polish male sprinters
Olympic athletes of Poland
Athletes (track and field) at the 2000 Summer Olympics
Athletes from Warsaw
World Athletics Championships winners